Wroughton is a large village and civil parish in northeast Wiltshire, England. It is part of the Borough of Swindon and lies along the A4361 between Swindon and Avebury; the road into Swindon crosses the M4 motorway between junctions 15 and 16.

The parish includes North Wroughton, formerly a small settlement on the road towards Swindon but now part of the built-up area; and the hamlets of Elcombe and Overtown.

History
The earliest evidence of human presence in the area is from the Mesolithic period, although this is fairly limited. More significant evidence of settlement and occupation in the area is available for the Neolithic period, most notably due to the extensive ritual complex at Avebury and scattered finds in the locality. The earliest archaeological evidence from within Wroughton dates from the Roman period (AD 43–410), showing a period of intensive settlement and farming in the area. Occupation of the area continued into the early Middle Ages (AD 410–1066) when two battles are understood to have taken place in the area: Breahburh (AD 567), thought to have been fought by Ceawlin of Wessex on the slopes of Barbury Hill, and Ellandun (AD 825) at Elcombe Hall by Egbert of Wessex. However, there is no agreement that the latter was here (it is known to have been south of Swindon). Burial sites in the vicinity are believed to be associated with these battles.

Until the 19th century it was just a country village. Wroughton is close to The Ridgeway, a national path which is connected to the ancient Uffington White Horse. In the 20th century the village grew but largely avoided the effects of suburbanisation while its larger neighbour Swindon expanded rapidly to the immediate north. The construction of the M4 motorway prevented Swindon from enveloping Wroughton, which has retained a village identity, albeit with the population of a small market town (approximately 8,000 residents) in the early 21st century.

In 1874, the village celebrated for two days after the horse George Frederick which was stabled in the High Street, won The Derby. The horse and its trainer, Tom Leader, who was born in Wroughton, were escorted from Swindon railway station by a brass band and received in the village which had declared all of its pubs to be open houses and provided free beer for the occasion.

Wroughton Feast
Between 1855 and 1930, there was an "annual feast"—a week-long summer fair attended by local farmers and residents from north Wiltshire in the school holidays. Events included "A Programme of Horse, Pony, Donkey and Foot racing; climbing the greasy pole ..." the prize being a leg of mutton at the end. The event was held at the rear of the Three Tuns pub with other local fairs and a grandstand was built in the field. The main event was the "Champion Gip Fight", a bare-knuckle boxing competition between a Gypsy champion and a challenger.

Frederick Large, in his book A Swindon Retrospect 1855–1930 comments: 
"At Wroughton Feast, an annual festival lasting a week, it was the custom for many years for "the champion gip" to fight the best man who could be produced, for a purse of gold. The venue was the paddock at the back of the Three Tuns tavern, where the usual paraphernalia of fairs used to congregate in full force. The Feast always took place in the summer at a time which included a week of our school holidays. I was not more than seven or eight years of age when, without my parents' consent, I wandered over to Wroughton ... This annual event always commenced on a Sunday evening by friends and neighbours from Swindon, Wroughton and neighbouring villages congregating at the Three Tuns, where, crowded inside and out, large quantities of beer and spirits were consumed. A miniature grand stand was erected for Feast Week in an orchard adjoining the paddock, upon which many of the elite of the neighbourhood, both ladies and gentlemen, occupied seats, and indulged freely in choice fruits and refreshments."

Buildings and amenities

Schools
The Ridgeway School and Sixth Form College opened in 1967 as Wiltshire's first purpose-built comprehensive school. It teaches about 1,500 children aged 11–18. The catchment area includes Bishopstone, Hinton Parva, Wanborough, Liddington, Coate, Badbury, Chiseldon, Hodson, Uffcott, Broad Hinton and Winterbourne Bassett.

RAF Wroughton
RAF Wroughton, just south of the village, closed in the 1990s. The site is now the Science Museum at Wroughton, a part of the Science Museum Group and used as a storage site occasionally open to the public. Since 2016, television series The Grand Tour has used part of the northern perimeter road as a car test track.

Ellendune Centre
The Ellendune Centre is a sports and entertainment venue that boasts one of the larger amateur facilities in the local area. It plays host to amateur dramatic groups who use it to meet and perform, including the Ellendune Entertainers and WADAMS (Wroughton Amateur Dramatic and Musical Society).

Parish church

The Church of England parish church of St John and St Helen has Norman origins but is mostly from the 14th century, with a 15th-century tower. The church was restored by T.H. Wyatt in 1846 and again in 1852, the 1880s and 1905. It was designated as Grade I listed in 1955.

Wroughton reservoir
Wroughton reservoir on Overtown Hill Road is a live fishing site. The main types of fish are Tench, Bream, Crucian Carp, Rudd and Carp. The reservoir is 1.01 hectares in size and the water is fed from the large area of fields above.

Sport
Wroughton ASC Swimming Club trains young swimmers and competes in team galas both locally and across Wiltshire, as well as the annual Wiltshire County Championships.

A greyhound racing track was opened in the fields opposite the Black Horse Hotel and Inn in North Wroughton on 26 July 1930. The race distance was 500 yards. The racing was independent (not affiliated to the sports governing body the National Greyhound Racing Club) and it was known as a flapping track which was the nickname given to independent tracks. It is not known when the racing ended.

For many years, the twinning committee organised a fun Bowls/Pétanque tournament. Some Saint-Germinois would come from the twin-town to play on Wroughton's boulodrome (pétanque terrain) and some Wroughtonians would return the compliment on St Germain's bowling green.

Notable people

Fiona Benson, poet, born in Wroughton in 1978
Sir Henry Langton, later Calley (1914–1997), RAF pilot, county councillor and Chairman of Wiltshire County Council, lived at Wroughton
Geoffrey Cox, Attorney General for England and Wales and MP for the Torridge and West Devon constituency, born in Wroughton
Jahméne Aaron Douglas, singer, runner-up to James Arthur on the ninth series of The X Factor in 2012, brought up in Wroughton
William Gosling (VC) (1892–1945), recipient of the Victoria Cross in 1917, farmer at Wroughton

Twin Town
Wroughton is twinned with
 Saint-Germain-lès-Corbeil, France

References

External links

 
 Wroughton Parish Council
 Wroughton Parish Church

Civil parishes in Wiltshire
Villages in Wiltshire
Borough of Swindon